Live at Carnegie Hall 1970 is a live album by Jethro Tull, released in vinyl LP on 18 April 2015, for Record Store Day. It was recorded on 4 November 1970 at Carnegie Hall, New York City. It consists of a heavily-edited version of the complete show, previously issued partially on side 3 of the Living in the Past album, on the 2010 Collector's Edition of Stand Up  and on Disc 2 of the 25th Anniversary Box Set.

Track listing

Disc 1 
Side One
 "Nothing Is Easy" - 5:34
 "My God" - 12:43
Side Two
 "With You There To Help Me/By Kind Permission Of" - 13:34
 "A Song for Jeffrey" - 5:25

Disc 2 
Side One
 "To Cry You A Song" - 6:03
 "Sossity, You're A Woman"/"Reasons For Waiting"/"Sossity, You're A Woman" - 5:28
 "Dharma For One" (Ian Anderson/Clive Bunker) - 13:37
Side Two
 "We Used To Know" - 3:41
 "Guitar Solo" - 8:25
 "For A Thousand Mothers" - 4:43

Personnel 
 Ian Anderson – acoustic guitar, flute, vocals
 Glenn Cornick – bass
 Clive Bunker – drums
 Martin Barre – guitars
 John Evan – keyboards

See also 
 Nothing Is Easy: Live at the Isle of Wight 1970

References

External links 
 Live at Carnegie Hall 1970 at Record Store Day (Vinyl LP)

Jethro Tull (band) live albums
2015 live albums
Albums recorded at Carnegie Hall